Transcription factor SOX-13 is a protein that in humans is encoded by the SOX13 gene.

Function 

This gene encodes a member of the SOX (SRY-related HMG-box) family of transcription factors involved in the regulation of embryonic development and in the determination of cell fate. The encoded protein may act as a transcriptional regulator after forming a protein complex with other proteins. It has also been determined to be a type-1 diabetes autoantigen, also known as islet cell antibody 12.

In melanocytic cells SOX13 gene expression may be regulated by MITF.

See also 
 SOX genes

References

Further reading

External links 
 

Transcription factors